Thomas Welles was an American politician in 17th-century Connecticut.

Thomas Welles may also refer to:

Thomas Welles (MP) for Newcastle-under-Lyme (UK Parliament constituency)
Tom Welles, character in 8mm (film)

See also
Thomas Wells (disambiguation)